Gianni Carrara (8 February 1929 – 11 March 1992) was an Italian cross-country skier. He competed in the men's 50 kilometre event at the 1956 Winter Olympics.

References

External links
 

1929 births
1992 deaths
Italian male cross-country skiers
Olympic cross-country skiers of Italy
Cross-country skiers at the 1956 Winter Olympics
Sportspeople from the Province of Bergamo